J. G. Wood may refer to:
John George Wood (1827–1889), English writer on natural history
Joseph Garnett Wood (1900–1959), Australian botanist

See also
Wood (surname)